Race and ethnicity in Colombia descends mainly from three racial groups—Europeans, Amerindians, and Africans—that have mingled throughout the last 500 years of the country's history. Some demographers describe Colombia as one of the most ethnically diverse countries in the Western Hemisphere and in the World, with 900 different ethnic groups. Most Colombians identify themselves and others according to ancestry, physical appearance, and sociocultural status. Social relations reflect the importance attached to certain characteristics associated with a given racial group. Although these characteristics no longer accurately differentiate social categories, they still contribute to one's rank in the social hierarchy.  Public Library of Science (PLOS) genetic research determined that  the average Colombian (of all races) has a mixture of European 62.5%, native Amerindian 27.4% , African 9.2% and East Asian 0.9%. These proportions also vary widely among ethnicities.

Racial/ethnic groups and their frequency

Colombia officially acknowledges three ethnic minority groups: the Afro-Colombian, indigenous, and Romani populations. The Afro-Colombian population consists mainly of blacks, mulattoes, raizales, palenqueros, and zambos (a term used since colonial times for individuals of mixed Amerindian and black ancestry). A 1999 resolution of the Ministry of the Interior and Justice acknowledged the Romani population as a Colombian ethnic group, although Romani people were not recognized in the 1991 constitution (unlike the Afro-Colombian and indigenous populations). Estimates vary widely, but the 2018 census found that the ethnic minority populations had increased significantly since the 1993 census, possibly owing to the methodology used. Specifically, it reported that the Afro-Colombian population accounted for 6.68 percent of the national population; the Amerindian population, for 4.31 percent; and the others like Romani for 0.06 percent
The 2018 census reported that the "non-ethnic population", consisting of whites and mestizos, constituted 87 percent of the national population.

Distribution of racial/ethnic groups geographically
The various groups exist in differing concentrations throughout the nation, in a pattern that to some extent goes back to colonial origins. The Whites tend to live mainly in the urban centers like Bogotá or Medellín. The populations of the major cities are primarily mestizo and white. The large Mestizo population includes most campesinos (people living in rural areas) of the Andean highlands, where some Spanish conquerors mixed with the women of Amerindian chiefdoms. Mestizos had always lived in the cities as well, as artisans and small tradesmen, and they have played a major part in the urban expansion of recent decades.
According to the 2005 census, the heaviest concentration of the indigenous population (22 to 61 percent) is located in the departments of Amazonas, La Guajira, Guainía, Vaupés, and Vichada. The secondary concentrations of 6 to 21 percent are located in the departments of Sucre, Córdoba, Chocó, Cauca and Nariño. Amerindian communities have legal autonomy to enforce their own traditional laws and customs. Despite its small percentage of the national population, the indigenous population has managed to regain nearly a quarter of the country's land titles under the 1991 constitution.

The 1991 National Constitution of Colombia defined Territorial Entities (Entidades Territoriales) as departments, districts, municipalities and indigenous territories.
Within an Indigenous Territory Entity (ETI) the people have autonomy in managing their interests, and within the limits of the constitution have the right to manage resources and define taxes required to perform their duties. ETIs are to be defined by the government in conformance with the Organic Law on Land Management.
However, this law has yet to be sanctioned so in practice the territories are unregulated.

The Black, Zambo and Mulatto populations have largely remained in the lowland areas on the Caribbean and Pacific coasts, its islands, and along the Cauca and Magdalena Rivers. The Afro-Colombian population is concentrated primarily (21% to 80% of their departments) in the departments of Chocó, San Andrés, Bolívar and in the lowland parts of Cauca (communities such as Lopez de Micay, Guapi, and Timbiqui), and Valle del Cauca departments (in areas like the largest city on the Pacific coast, Buenaventura, and large concentration in Cali), with secondary concentrations (10 to 18 percent of the departments) in Atlántico, Córdoba, Magdalena, Nariño (communities like El Charco, Tumaco and Barbacoas), Antioquia (mostly in La Uraba region), La Guajira, Cesar, and Sucre departments. Chocó is the department with the largest concentration of African-descendants in Colombia.

The population of the Archipelago of San Andrés, Providencia and Santa Catalina, which Colombia inherited from Spain after the Spanish had overcome an initial British settlement, is mostly Afro-Colombian, including several thousand raizal blacks. Despite the length of time during which Colombia has had jurisdiction over them, most raizales on these Caribbean islands have retained their Protestant religion, have continued to speak an English-based creole language as well as English, and have regarded themselves as a group distinct from mainland residents. A minute percentage of the insular population originated in Scotland and Syria.

Social status of racial/ethnic minorities
Since independence both Amerindians and blacks have continued to reside on the outskirts of national life. As a group, however, blacks have become more integrated into the national society and have left a greater mark on it for several reasons. Moreover, the blacks came from different areas of Africa, often did not share the same language or culture, and were not grouped into organized social units on arrival in the New World. Despite slave revolts, no large community of escaped slaves survived in isolation to preserve its African heritage, as did the maroons in Jamaica, except for the village of Palenque de San Basilio, located southeast of Cartagena, which was one of the walled communities called 'palenques', founded by escaped slaves as a refuge in the seventeenth century. Of the many palenques that existed in former times, only the one of San Basilio has survived until the present day and developed into a unique cultural space.

Finally, despite their position on the bottom rung of the social ladder, black slaves often had close relations—as domestic servants—with Spaniards and British and were therefore exposed to Spanish culture much more than were the Amerindians. Thus, blacks became a part of Colombian society from the beginning, adopting the ways of the Spanish that were permitted them and learning their language. By the end of the colonial period, the blacks thought of themselves as Colombians and felt superior to the Amerindians, who officially occupied higher status, were nominally free, and were closer in skin color, facial features, and hair texture to the emerging mestizo mix.

Many blacks left slave status early in Colombian history, becoming part of the free population. Their owners awarded freedom to some, others purchased their liberty, but probably the greatest number achieved freedom by escape. Many slaves were liberated as a result of revolts, particularly in the Cauca valley and along the Caribbean coast. The elimination of slavery began with a free-birth law in 1821, but total emancipation was enacted only in 1851, becoming effective on January 1, 1852.

Those blacks who achieved freedom sometimes moved into Amerindian communities, but blacks and zambos remained at the bottom of the social scale and were important only as a source of labor. Others founded their own settlements, mainly in unsettled lands of the Pacific basin where they were called cimarrones (maroons). Those regions were very unhealthy, inhospitable, and dangerous. A number of towns, such as San Basilio de Palenque in the present department of Bolívar, and San José de Uré in southern Córdoba, kept the history of revolt alive in their oral traditions. In the Chocó area, along the Pacific, many of the black communities remained relatively unmixed, probably because there were few whites in the area, and the Amerindians became increasingly resistant to assimilation.

In other regions, such as San Andrés y Providencia, or the Magdalena valley, black communities had considerable white and/or Amerindian admixture. Descendants of slaves have preserved relatively little of their African heritage or identification. Some placenames are derived from African languages, and some traditional musical instruments brought into the country by slaves are used throughout the country. Religion in the black communities remains the most durable link with the African past. Wholly black communities have been disappearing, not only because their residents have been moving to the cities but also because the surrounding mestizo and white populations have been moving into black communities. Eventual absorption into the mixed milieu appears inevitable. Moreover, as blacks have moved into the mainstream of society from its peripheries, they have perceived the advantages of better education and jobs. Rather than forming organizations to promote their advancement as a group, blacks have for the most part concentrated on achieving mobility through individual effort and adaptation to the prevailing system.

Afro-Colombians are entitled to all constitutional rights and protections, but they continue to face significant economic and social discrimination. According to the 2005 census, an estimated 74 percent of Afro-Colombians earned less than the minimum wage. Chocó, the department with the highest percentage of Afro-Colombian residents, had the lowest level of social investment per capita and ranked last in terms of education, health, and infrastructure. It also continued to experience some of the country's worst political violence, as paramilitaries and guerrillas struggled for control of the department's key drug- and weapons-smuggling corridors.

Media

The television comedy Sábados Felices has been criticised for including a blackface character.

Immigrants in Colombia
Colombia has received across its history different groups of immigrants.

White Colombians are mainly of Spanish descent, who arrived in the beginning of the 16th century when Colombia was part of the Spanish Empire. During the 19th and 20th centuries, other European  and Middle Eastern peoples migrated to Colombia, notably Italian and Lebanese people but also Irish, Germans, French, Palestinians, Syrians among others.

Colombia was one of early focus of Basque and Sephardi immigration. Between 1540 and 1559, 8.9% of the residents of Colombia were of Basque origin. Basque priests introduced handball into Colombia. Jewish converts to Christianity and some crypto-Jews also sailed with the early conquistadors.

Many immigrant communities have settled on the Caribbean coast, in particular recent immigrants from the Middle East. Barranquilla (the largest city of the Colombian Caribbean) and other Caribbean cities have the largest populations of Lebanese, Palestinian, and other Arabs. In some sectors of society there is a considerable input of Italian and German ancestry.

There are also important communities of Chinese, Japanese, Romanis and Jews. British and Jamaicans migrated mainly to the islands of San Andres and Providencia.

Since 2010 there is a major migration trend of Venezuelans, due to the political and economic situation in Venezuela.

See also
Demographics of Colombia
Immigration to Colombia

References

Works cited
Bushnell, David and Rex A. Hudson.  "Racial distinctions".  In Colombia: A Country Study (Rex A. Hudson, ed.).  Library of Congress Federal Research Division (2010). 

 
Society of Colombia
Race in Latin America
Latin American caste system